Canada's Athletes of the 20th century as voted on in a 1999 survey of newspaper editors and broadcasters conducted by the Canadian Press and Broadcast News:

Top 10 Female Athletes
 Nancy Greene (born 1943), skier
 Silken Laumann (born 1964), rower
 Barbara Ann Scott (1928–2012), figure skater
 Myriam Bédard (born 1969), biathlon
 Marnie McBean (born 1968), rower
 Fanny "Bobbie" Rosenfeld (1904–1969), track-and-field (voted female athlete of the first half of the century)
 Catriona Le May Doan (born 1970), speed skater
 Sandra Post (born 1948), golfer
 Marilyn Bell (born 1937), long-distance swimmer
 Elaine Tanner (born 1951), swimmer

Top 10 Male Athletes
 Wayne Gretzky (born 1961), ice hockey player
 Gordie Howe (1928–2016), ice hockey player
 Bobby Orr (born 1948), ice hockey player
 Lionel Conacher (1901–1954), multi-sport athlete (voted male athlete of the first half of the century)
 Maurice Richard (1921–2000), ice hockey player
 Donovan Bailey (born 1967), track-and-field
 Ferguson Jenkins (born 1943), baseball player
 Mario Lemieux (born 1965), ice hockey player
 Larry Walker (born 1966), baseball player
 Gaétan Boucher (born 1958), speed skater

Team of the Century
 1972 Team Canada in ice hockey, defeated the Soviet Union in the first ever series involving NHL players

See also

Members of Canada's Sports Hall of Fame
Members of Canada's Olympic Hall of Fame
Recipients of the Lou Marsh Trophy
Bobbie Rosenfeld Award (female)
Velma Springstead Trophy (female)
Lionel Conacher Award (male)

Lists of Canadian sportspeople
+
Studies of Canadian history
Top sports lists